General elections were held in Barbados on 28 May 1986. The result was a landslide victory for the Democratic Labour Party, which won 24 of the 27 seats. Among the Barbados Labour Party MPs who lost their seats was incumbent Prime Minister Harold Bernard St. John. The Workers Party of Barbados contested the elections for the first and only time, the only occasion on which a communist party contested an election in Barbados. Voter turnout was 77%.

Results

References

Barbados
1986 in Barbados
Elections in Barbados
May 1986 events in North America
Landslide victories